Laughing and Crying, Living and Dying is a country album by Billy "Crash" Craddock. It was released in 1979 on the Capitol label.

Track listing
"My Mama Never Heard Me Sing"
"A Hundred Miles an Hour"
"'Till I Stop Shaking"
"Don't Take Any Wooden Nickels"
"As Long as I Live"
"One Dream Coming, One Dream Going"
"Sneak Out of Love with You"
"When I Get Over You"
"Robinhood"
"Station Wagon Mama (Car Pool Queen)"

Billy "Crash" Craddock albums
1979 albums
Capitol Records albums